Viktor Karlovich Shmidt was a Russian zoologist, leading Russian specialist in microscopic anatomy and embryology, professor, the Head of Perm University, the Head of Perm National Research Biology Institute at Perm State University.

Sources
 Victor Shmidt at Russian Wikipedia: Шмидт, Виктор Карлович // Википедия, свободная энциклопедия.
 Victor Shmidt at Perm State Medical Academy website.
 Victor Shmidt. Perm Cultural Heritage

References

1865 births
1932 deaths
Russian histologists
Biologists from the Russian Empire
Russian zoologists